Velliangadu is the largest and capital village of Velliangadu panchayat union in the district of Coimbatore, also known as Kovai in the state of Tamil Nadu, India.

References 

Villages in Coimbatore district